The Islamic Republic of Iran Air Defense Force (Niroo-ye Padafand-e Havaei-ye Artesh-e Jomhuri-ye Eslami-ye Iran) is the anti-aircraft warfare service branch of Iran's regular military, the Islamic Republic of Iran Army (Artesh). It split from the air force (IRIAF) in 2008 and controls the country's military radar network.

History
In the late 1950s the (then) Imperial (Shah) Iranian Air Force was an important US allied force and a buffer to counter any possible Soviet attack in the unstable middle east region. Radar coverage of the Iranian airspace however was very poor in those days because of a lack of standardization, various former WW2 British and US radar equipment had been used, and because of the rough countryside.

US research learned that automation of the Iranian air defense conceptually consisted of: 2 hardened command posts (a primary one and its backup) buried in the northern and southern Iran mountains, and a radar network spread out over the country. Raw radar data from nationwide sites would have to be digitally converted and transferred via a national microwave telecommunication system to mainframe computers in the 2 command posts, where the information would have been converted into realtime data and further used in the command & control cycles.

In support of the (then) Imperial (Shah) Iranian Air Force the US funded an Iranian radar network and from 1962-1977 the USAF Communication Service (AFCS) constructed 19 radar facilities spread out over the country covering almost 70% of the Iranian airspace. In the northern part of Iran this was called the Spellout network and in the southern part the Peace Ruby network. A combined troposcatter communication link (Peace Net) connected both Spellout and Peace Ruby radar systems. The original radar sites are still standing; their technical and operational status after 40+ years however is unknown. 

Starting in 2002 Iran modernized its air defences with new air surveillance radars, replacing the outdated US systems, SAM's and Command, Control, Communications, Computers, Intelligence, Surveillance and Reconnaissance (C4ISR) systems  Iran purchased Russian multiple Russian Rezonas-N over the horizon backscatter radars of the Sepher (Sky) and the Ghadir (Almighty) systems. Together with the mobile deployable Falaq, an Iranian version of the Russian 67N6E Gamma D radar  the entire Iranian airspace has been covered 

As of 1996, Iranian Air Defence forces included about 18,000 military personnel. The tradition of aircraft-based air defense, derived from the US-trained Air Force from before the 1979 Iranian Revolution, was giving way to an expanding arsenal of ground-based air defense missile systems. Still, Iran was at the time unable to construct a nationwide, integrated air defense network, and continued to rely on point defense of key locations with surface-to-air missile batteries.

The bulk of Iran's Air Force Air Defence holdings by the mid-1990s revolved around 30 Improved HAWK fire units (12 battalions/150+ launchers), 45-60 SA-2 and HQ-2J/23 (CSA-1 Chinese equivalents of the SA-2) launchers. Also available were some 30 Rapier and 15 Tigercat SAM launchers. There are reports of the transfer of SA-6 launchers to Iran from Russia in 1995/1996. In 1997, the Iranian Air Defense forces declared the Almaz S-200 Angara (SA-5 'Gammon') low-to high-altitude surface-to-air missile (SAM) operational.

In December 2005, Iran entered into a contract to purchase 29 TOR-M1 (SA-15 Gauntlet) mobile surface-to-air missile defense systems from Russia worth more than US$700 million (EUR 600 million).
Between 1998 and 2002, Iran imported approximately 6 JY-14 surveillance radars from the China National Electronics Import-Export Corporation. The radar can detect targets up to 300 km away and is now part of Iran's air defense system.

On 1 September 2008, it was reported that Russia may proceed with plans to sell advanced S-300 air defence systems to Iran under a secret contract believed to have been signed in 2005. On 22 September 2010, Russian President Dmitry Medvedev signed a decree banning the sale of the S-300 and other military equipment to Iran. The sale was canceled because of United Nations Security Council Resolution 1929 sanctions on Iran. On 10 November 2010, Iran announced that it had developed a version of the S-300 missile. By the end of 2016 Russia had lifted the self-imposed ban on the sale and completed delivery of all missiles to Iran.

Iranian land forces have a total of some 1,700 anti-aircraft guns including 14.5mm ZPU-2/-4, 23mm ZSU-23-4, 23mm ZU-23s, 37mm Type 55s, 57mm ZSU-57-2 and 100mm KS-19s. Iran also had 100-180 Bofors L/70 40mm guns and modest numbers of Skyguard 35mm twin anti-aircraft guns. Its largest holding consisted of ZU-23s(which it can manufacture).

Recently Iran has built several new anti-aircraft guns including Samavat 35mm Anti-Aircraft Guns, Sa'ir 100mm Anti-Aircraft Guns (Upgraded automatic version of KS-19) and the Mesbah 1 air defense system.

On 21 August 2012, the Iranian military started construction of its largest air defense base in the city of Abadeh in the Southern Fars Province. The air defense base is due to be built at the cost of $300 million and will have 6,000 personnel available for a large array of duties, including educational ones. Days later, the defense ministry also announced plans to develop Bavar 373, a new long-range air-defense system, by March 21, 2013.

Equipment

Radar systems
 Sepehr
 Alim
 Falaq
 Asr
 Arash
 Ghamar
 Matla-ul-fajr
 Qadir
 Kashef

Artillery air-defense systems
 ZU-23-2
 Oerlikon GDF
 100 mm air defense gun KS-19
 Mesbah 1
 ZSU-23-4 Shilka
 ZSU-57-2

Man-portable air-defense systems
 Misagh-1
 Misagh-2
 Qaem
 Kamin-2
 HN-5
 RBS-70

Missile air-defense systems
 MIM-23 Hawk
 Rapier
 2K12 Kub
 Sayyad-2
 Herz-9
 Mersad
 HQ-2J
 HQ-7
 Shalamcheh
 Shahin
 Ya Zahra
 Ra'd
 Khordad 15
 Khordad 3
 Tabas
 Bavar-373
 Talaash
 Tor
 S-75
 S-300
 SA-8 
 SA-13
 SA-11/17

Commanders

References

Islamic Republic of Iran Army
Military units and formations established in 2008
Air defence forces